Mohammed III may refer to:

Muhammad III of Córdoba (fl. 1024 – 1025), Umayyad Caliph of Cordoba
Muhammad an-Nasir, Caliph of Morocco from 1198 to 1213
Muhammed III, Sultan of Granada (1256–1310), son of Muhammed II al-Faqih and third Nasrid ruler of Granada in Iberia
Mehmed III, Sultan of the Ottoman Empire from 1595 to 1603
Abdul Abdallah Mohammed III Saadi, Sultan of Morocco from 1603 to 1608
Mohamed III ben Hassan, Dey of Algiers from 1718 to 1724
Mohammed III of Morocco, Sultan of Morocco from 1757 to 1790
Muhammad III as-Sadiq, Bey of Tunis from 1859 to 1882
Mohammed III Shammaa Zengi, Prince of Zengid Dynasty from 1883 – 1954